New Zealand Māori women’s rugby league team, also known as Wahine Toa, is a rugby league representative side made up of New Zealand Māori players. The side represents the New Zealand Māori Rugby league. The team has competed in international competition, including Test Matches and the 2003 World Cup. 
Since 2018 the team has competed in an annual All Stars match, against the Australian Indigenous women’s rugby league team.

Current squad
The following players were selected and played in the 11 February 2023 match against the Indigenous All Stars.
 

Note: * = Player's age estimated based on previous articles on various news and rugby league websites.

Results

See also
 New Zealand women's national rugby league team
 New Zealand Māori rugby league team
 Māori All Blacks

References

New Zealand Māori rugby league team
New Zealand women's national rugby league team
Women's national rugby league teams